Chuck is an American spy action-comedy-drama television series created by Josh Schwartz and Chris Fedak. It premiered on the terrestrial television network NBC on September 24, 2007, airing on Mondays at 8:00 pm ET. Chuck centers on Chuck Bartowski (played by Zachary Levi), an "average computer-whiz-next-door", who receives an encoded e-mail from an old college friend now working in the CIA; the message embeds the only remaining copy of the world's greatest spy secrets into Chuck's brain. The first season of Chuck aired in 2007–08, containing 13 episodes. After the 2007–08 Writers Guild of America strike, NBC renewed Chuck for a second season instead of extending the first to a full season of 22 episodes. The full-length second season originally aired in 2008–09. Episodes of Chuck are also available in various new media formats. The first through fifth seasons are available to purchase on DVD and  Blu-ray. In the United States, United Kingdom and Canada, every episode is available for download from iTunes. Episode titles for Chuck are consistently formatted as "Chuck Versus...". For example, the pilot episode is titled "Chuck Versus the Intersect". This list is ordered by the episodes' original air date and not by the production codes, which show the order in which episodes were filmed.

On May 13, 2011, NBC renewed Chuck for a fifth and final season consisting of 13 episodes, which premiered on October 28, 2011.

Series overview

Episodes

Season 1 (2007–08)

Season 2 (2008–09)

Season 3 (2010)

Season 4 (2010–11) 

It was initially announced on May 14, 2010, that NBC renewed Chuck for a fourth season consisting of 13 episodes with an option for a back nine; on October 19, 2010, NBC ordered an additional eleven episodes (rather than the original option of nine), bringing the number of season four episodes to 24, the largest for the series.

Season 5 (2011–12)

NBC confirmed that the fifth and final season of Chuck would consist of thirteen episodes on May 13, 2011, returning in the fall on Friday nights at 8/7c; the season aired from October 28, 2011, to January 27, 2012.

Web-based spin-offs

Chuck Versus the Webisodes

Meet the Nerd Herders

Morgan's Vlog

Chuck Presents – Buy Hard: The Jeff and Lester Story

Notes

References

External links 
 
 

Lists of American comedy-drama television series episodes